The 7th Legislative Yuan was a session of the Legislative Yuan of Taiwan from 1 February 2008 to 31 January 2012. Members were elected to constituency (district) seats in the 12 January 2008 legislative election. The next legislative election took place in January 2012.

List of constituency members

Former makeup
The following is the list of constituencies that were in place at the time of the 2004 legislative election.

See also
 2008 Taiwan legislative election
 List of candidates of Taiwan legislative election, 2008
 Eighth Legislative Yuan
 Ninth Legislative Yuan

 
07
Constituency